Bolkhov is a town and the administrative center of Bolkhovsky District in Oryol Oblast, Russia, located on the Nugr River (Oka's tributary),  from Oryol, the administrative center of the oblast. Population:    12,800 (1969); 20,703 (1897).

History
Bolkhov was first documented in a chronicle from 1196. After the Mongol invasion of Rus', it became the seat of a local princely dynasty, whose descendants may be traced until the 19th century. In the 16th century, it became one of the fortified posts for defending Moscow from the Tatars on the south. It was there that the army of Vasily IV was defeated by False Dmitry II in 1608.

During World War II, Bolkhov was occupied by the German Army from October 9, 1941 to July 28, 1943.

Administrative and municipal status
Within the framework of administrative divisions, Bolkhov serves as the administrative center of Bolkhovsky District. As an administrative division, it is incorporated within Bolkhovsky District as the town of district significance of Bolkhov. As a municipal division, the town of district significance of Bolkhov is incorporated within Bolkhovsky Municipal District as Bolkhov Urban Settlement.

Religion
Bolkhov preserves four churches dating from the turn of the 18th century, including the five-domed Trinity Monastery Cathedral (1688-1706) and the Trinity church with an elongated belfry. By far the largest church in the city is the Savior's Transfiguration Cathedral, built in 1841-1851 to a design by one of Konstantin Thon's disciples.

References

Notes

Sources

External links
Official website of Bolkhov 
Bolkhov Business Directory 

Cities and towns in Oryol Oblast
Bolkhovsky Uyezd